Bruce Springsteen Archives is an ongoing collection of officially released live albums by Bruce Springsteen and the E Street Band. Beginning in November 2014 with the release of the 2012 Apollo Theater concert, Springsteen sought out to release fully recorded shows from his past archives officially to fans for purchase. The releases, which focus on past tours prior to the launch of the archive, have ranged from the Born to Run tours through the Wrecking Ball World Tour; subsequent shows from 2014 on have been released on an ongoing basis, with full tours represented, as part of the same program.

The idea originally came after Springsteen released every concert from his High Hopes Tour for fans to purchase. Those shows were originally released for a limited time after the original concert dates, and were made available on a permanent basis after the launch of the archive. Several shows had previously circulated among fans as bootleg recordings; the archive releases are sourced from soundboard recordings, and are digitally restored and remastered. Releases are provided in a variety of digital download formats or on CD.

Following the release of the Wachovia Spectrum 2009 show, it was announced that the following releases would focus shows even further back the band's history to cover more historic tours and performances, and in August 2017, nugs.net representative Brad Serling announced during an interview on E Street Radio that 25 additional archive releases were planned, to be released on a monthly schedule, starting with the 1977 Palace Theatre and Auditorium Theatre shows. The archive series has since eclipsed that original expansion as of the May 3, 2019, release.

Releases

References

External links
Bruce Springsteen Archives

 
Live albums by American artists
Album series